Nepal competed at the 2016 Summer Olympics in Rio de Janeiro, Brazil, from 5 to 21 August 2016. This was the nation's thirteenth consecutive appearance at the Summer Olympics, although it failed to register any athletes in 1968.

The Nepal Olympic Committee selected a team of seven athletes, three men and four women, across five different sports at the Games; all of them made their Olympic debut in Rio de Janeiro through wild card entries and universality places, without having qualified. Among the nation's athletes were taekwondo fighter Nisha Rawal (women's +67 kg), London-based backstroke swimmer Gaurika Singh, who etched her name into the history records by becoming the youngest Olympian of the Games (aged 13), and judoka Phupu Lhamu Khatri, who also created history as the first female athlete to carry the Nepalese flag in the opening ceremony.

Nepal, however, has yet to win its first-ever Olympic medal. Unable to reach the final, Rawal bounced back from her early elimination in the opening match to produce a seventh-place feat as the best result for the Nepalis at the Games, losing the repechage bout to former world champion and 2008 bronze medalist Gwladys Épangue of France.

Archery
 
Nepal has received an invitation from the Tripartite Commission to send a male archer to the Olympic tournament, signifying the nation's Olympic debut in the sport.

Athletics
 
Nepal has received an invitation from the Tripartite Commission to send two track and field athletes (one male and one female) to the Olympics.

Track & road events

Judo
 
Nepal has received an invitation from the Tripartite Commission to send a judoka competing in the women's half-middleweight category (63 kg), signifying the nation's Olympic return to the sport after an eight-year hiatus.

Swimming

Nepal has received a Universality invitation from FINA to send two swimmers (one male and one female) to the Olympics.

Taekwondo
 
Nepal received an invitation from the Tripartite Commission to send Nisha Rawal in the women's heavyweight category (+67 kg) into the Olympic taekwondo competition, signifying the nation's Olympic return to the sport after an eight-year hiatus.

See also
List of Olympic athletes of Nepal

References

External links 

 
 

Olympics
Nations at the 2016 Summer Olympics
2016